Ralph Barnes may refer to:

Ralph Barnes (priest) (fl. 1775–1820), 18th century British Archdeacon of Totnes
Ralph Barnes (journalist) (1899–1940), American war correspondent
Ralph Mosser Barnes (1900–1984), American industrial engineer 
Ralph Barnes (died 1537), English monk and Catholic martyr
SS Ralph Barnes